"9 to 5" is a song recorded by from English rapper Lady Sovereign. Released as the second single from the rapper's debut studio album Public Warning (2006), following the release of her first UK top 75 single "Random". It was her debut single for Def Jam Recordings and was released on 8 August 2005. It contains a sample from the British movie Time Bandits.

The single became Lady Sovereign's first top 40 hit in the UK, peaking at number 33 on the singles chart. It's also featured in the EA Sports 2006 video game 2006 FIFA World Cup. The single was backed by a remix by indie band the Ordinary Boys. "9 to 5" also had three videos, one for the original and another two for "The Ordinary Boys Remix".

Track list
CD single 1
 "9 to 5" (original version) – 3:23
 "Tango" – 3:36

CD single 2
 "9 to 5" (original version)
 "Nine2Five" (The Ordinary Boys remix) – 3:25
 "9 to 5" (JME remix)
 "9 to 5" (Tony Senghore's Sleepwalker vocal mix)
 "9 to 5" (Tony Senghore's Gosh Darn It! dub)
 "9 to 5" (video)

12-inch single
 A1 "9 to 5" (original version)
 A2 "9 to 5" (JME remix)
 A3 "9 to 5" (Tony Senghore's No Turning Back mix)
 B1 "9 to 5" (Tony Senghore's Sleepwalker vocal mix)
 B2 "9 to 5" (Tony Senghore's Gosh Darn It! dub)

"Nine2Five"

"Nine2Five" is the renamed and re-recorded "The Ordinary Boys" remix of Lady Sovereign's single "9 to 5". The remix was released as a duet single and was credited as the Ordinary Boys vs. Lady Sovereign and was the seventh for the Ordinary Boys and the fourth for Lady Sovereign. A new music video was shot for the single but Lady Sovereign had to film her parts for the re-make in the US.

The single's re-release was a much bigger hit than the original, peaking 27 places higher than the original at number six on the UK Singles Chart, becoming Lady Sovereign's first UK top-10 hit and the Ordinary Boys' second.

The song was featured on the St. Trinian's Soundtrack in 2007.

Track listings
CD single 1
 "Nine2Five" – the Ordinary Boys vs. Lady Sovereign – 3:05
 "My Girl" (featuring Suggs live at Brixton Academy) – the Ordinary Boys – 2:53

7-inch single 1 – The Re-Match
 "Nine2Five" – the Ordinary Boys vs. Lady Sovereign
 "9 to 5" (The Ordinary Boys remix) – Lady Sovereign – 3:25

7-inch single 2
 "Nine2Five" – the Ordinary Boys vs. Lady Sovereign
 "On an Island" (Live at Brixton Academy) – the Ordinary Boys

Charts

"9 to 5"

"Nine2Five"

Weekly charts

Year-end charts

References

2004 songs
2005 singles
2006 singles
Lady Sovereign songs
The Ordinary Boys songs
Songs written by Lady Sovereign